Jayanth Kaikini (born 24 January 1955)  is a poet, short story writer, playwright, columnist in Kannada and a lyricist in Kannada Cinema. He has so far published six anthologies of short stories, four books of poetry, three plays and a collection of essays. He is valued as one of the best writers in Kannada literature and has revolutionized the field by giving it a fresh new perspective. He has bagged in many notable awards like 'Karnataka Sahitya Academy' award. Kaikini is regarded as one of the most significant writers in Kannada today. Kaikini has been conferred the honorary doctorate from Tumkur University.

Early life 
Dr Kaikini was born in Gokarna to Gourish Kaikini, a thinker, litterateur and teacher, and Shanta Kaikini, a social worker. After studying  a M.Sc. in Biochemistry from Karnataka University, Dharwad, he moved to Mumbai where he worked as a chemist for many years. Jayanth Kaikini began his career working as a production chemist, eventually working also as a copywriter for advertising agencies in Bombay for 23 years before moving to Bangalore, where he held several key institutional positions - as founder of Kannada television channels Etv Kannada, Zee Kannada, becoming the literary editor of a monthly magazine Bhavana and hosting a widely popular television talk-show series Namaskara while being intellectually associated with the Kannada film industry.

Career 

Kaikini has published a number of poetry collections including Rangadindondishtu Doora, Kothitheertha, Shravana Madhyana, Neelimale, Theredashte Bagilu. He is also the author of short stories collections for Dagadoo Parabana Ashwamedha, Aamruthaballi Kashaya, Shabda Teera, Bannada kaalu, Toofan Mail, Ondu Jelebi, Charminar, Anarkaliya Safety Pin and Vichitraseneya Vaikhari. His work in translation No Presents Please has won widespread acclaim and accolades across the globe, including the DSC Prize for South Asian Literature. His first work in translation was Dots and Lines.

Jayanth Kaikini's initial foray into lyricism for Kannada film undustry includes movies like Dweepa and Chigurida Kanasu. Renowned Kannada film actor and singer Dr.Rajkumar sung "Bandhuve O Bandhuve", for which V. Manohar composed the music. He is credited with revolutionising the image of Kannada film songs, with the classic touch of literature, a nouvelle vocabulary and imagery that belongs to our lived worlds. Films like Mungaaru Male, Gaalipata, Milana etc. have some touching and memorable songs with lyrics penned by him.

He was hosting a TV Show "Rasa Rushige Namaskara" in Etv Kannada which a biography on Rashtrakavi Kuvempu. This show was very popular with a particular section of audience. He continued it with other series' such as "Kadala Theerada Bharghava",..etc.Lately he was seen judging the
reality show "Yede tumbi Haaduvenu" along with the legendary singer S. P. Balasubrahmanyam and famous Kannada music director and lyricist naada brahma Hamsalekha.

Kaikini received the Karnataka Sahitya Academy award for his first poetry collection at the age of nineteen in 1974. He received the same award again in 1982, 1989 and 1996 for his short story collections. He has been awarded the Dinakara Desai award for his poetry, the B. H. Sridhar award for fiction, the Katha National award and Rujuwathu trust fellowship, the Kusumagraj Award, Masti Prashasti amidst several other honours for his writings as well as an honorary Doctorate from Tumkur University.

He now lives in Bangalore with his wife/partner Smita Kaikini, an analytic chemist by training and an archivist, manager of the Kaikini family archives. His daughter Dr Srajana Kaikini is a philosopher, artist, academic who has also a trained Odissi dancer, and son Ritwik Kaikini is a multimedia artist, musician and writer. Apart from Kannada, Jayant is fluent in Konkani, Marathi, Hindi and English.

Selected works

Poetry 

 Rangadindondishtu Doora (1974)
 Kotitheertha (1982)
 Shravana Madhyahna (1987)
 Neelimale (1997)
 Jayant Kaikini Kavithegalu (2003)
 Ondu Jilebi (2008)
 Vichitra Senana Vaikhari(2021)
 Ello maleyagide(2012: Collection of Film songs penned by him)

Stories 

 Theredashte Baagilu (1982)
 Gaala (1982)
 Dagadoo Parabana Ashwamedha (1989)
 Amruthaballi Kashaya (1996)
 Jayanth Kaikini Kathegalu (2003)
 Bannada Kaalu (1999)
 Toofan Mail (2005)
 Charminaar (2012)
 No Presents Please... (2018)
 Anaarkaliya Safetypin (2021)

Essays 

 Bogaseyalli Male (2001)
 Shabda Theera (2004)
 Touring Talkies (2009)
 Gulmohar (2018)

Plays 

 Sevanti Prasanga (1997)
 Ithi Ninna Amrutha (1999)
 Jategiruvanu Chandeera (2004)
 Rupantara Natakagalu (2018)

Songs 

 " Oh " (Chigurida Kanasu)
 "Parichayisu" (Prema Pallakki)
 "We Are OK" (Prasad)
 "Ee Sanje Yakaagide" (Geleya)
 "Ninnindale" (Milana)
 "Male Nintu Hoda Mele" (Milana)
 "Anisutide Yaako Indu" (Mungaru Male)
 "Kunidhu Kunidhu Baare" (Mungaru Male)
 "Male Baruva Haagide" (Moggina Manasu)
 "Madhuvana Karedare" (Inti Ninna Preetiya)
 "Belad Minuguta" (Psycho)
 "Hey Mouna" (Krishna)
 "Minchaagi Neenu" (Gaalipata)
 "Poorva Para"
 "Maleya Haniyalli" (Januma Janumadallu)
 "Yaaro Kooda Ninna Haage" (Love Guru)
 "Yello Maleyaagide" (Manasaare)
 "Ondu Kanasu" (Manasaare)
 "Onde Ninna" (Manasaare)
 "Chalisuva Cheluve" (Ullasa Utsaha)
 "Nee Sanihake Bandare" (Maleyali Jotheyali)
 "Kudi Notave" (Parichaya)
 "Eruveya" ("Kinnare")
 "Turthinalli Geechida" (Chowka)
 "Madhura Pisumatige" (Birugali)
 "Hoovina Baanadanthe Yaarigu Kaanadanthe" (Birugaali)
 "Aaaramage Yiddenaanu" (Gokula)
 "neenendare nannolage" (Junglee)
 "Hrudayave Bayaside Ninnane" (Krishnan Love Story)
 "Ninna Gungalle" Lifeu Ishtene
 "Paravashanaadenu"  (Paramathma)
 "Yenendu Hesaridali" (Anna Bond)
 "Neeralli Sanna"  (Hudugaru)
 "Kanna Minche Jaahiratu Kaliyuva Hrudayake"  (Victory)
 "Yenano Helalende" (Dyavre)
 "Jiya Teri Jiya Mere" (Bhajarangi)
"Ninna Danigagi Ninna Karegagi" (Savaari 2)
"Ello Mareyaagi " (Savaari 2)
 "Jeene Laga" (Jaathre)
 "Nenape Nitya Mallige" (Kendasampige)
 "Kanasali Nadesu" (Kendasampige)
 "Mareyada Pustaka" (Rathavara)
 "Mouna Thaalide Dhaari" (2014) (Ninnindale)
 "Malage Malage" (Rikki)
 "Yele Mareyali" (Rikki)
 "Helilla Yarallu Naanu" (Krishna-Rukku)
 "Muddagi Neenu" (Ganapa)
 "Nanna Kanasina Roovaari" (Sipaayi)
 "Sariyaagi" (Mungaru Male 2)
 Bere Yaro Baredantide Salanu (Kaddipudi)
 Kaagadada Doniyalli (Kirik Party)
 Aakasha Neene (Ambari)
 Roopasi (Mugulu Nage)
 Badukina Bannave (Tagaru)
 Namma (Tagaru)
 Jeeva Sakhi (Tagaru)
 Aleva moda ("Aleva moda")
 Tajaa Samachara (Natasaarvabhowma)
 Gamanisu  Mungaru male 2
 Naanaadada Maatellva ("Gaalipata 2")
 Neenu Bagehariyada ("Gaalipata 2")

Awards for Films 

Filmfare Awards

 Best Lyricist (2009): Gaalipata – "Minchagi Neenu Baralu"
 Best Lyricist (2010): Manasaare – "Yello Maleyaagide"
 Best Lyricist (2015): Kendasampige – "Nenape Nithya Mallige"
 Best Lyricist (2016): Mungaru Male 2 – "Sariyagi Nenapide"
 Best Lyricist(2021) : Act -1978- " Telodo Moda" 

Nominated

 Best Lyricist (2010): Maleyali Jotheyali – "Ni Sanihake Bandare"
 Best Lyricist (2011): Krishnan Love Story – "Hrudayave"
 Best Lyricist (2012): Paramathma – "Paravashanaadenu"
 Best Lyricist (2013): Anna Bond – "Yenendhu Hesaridali"
 Best Lyricist (2014): Bhajarangi – "Jiya Teri"
 Best Lyricist (2017): Mugulu Nage – "Roopasi Summane"

Karnataka State Film Awards

 Best Dialogue Writer for Chigurida Kanasu 2003–04
 Best Lyricist for Mungaru Male (2006–07)

Awards for Literary Works 

 Karnataka Sahitya Akademi Award for Rangadindondishtu Doora (1974)
 Karnataka Sahitya Akademi Award for Theredashte Baagilu (1982)
 Karnataka Sahitya Akademi Award for Dagadoo Parabana Ashwamedha (1989)
 Karnataka Sahitya Akademi Award for Amruthaballi Kashaya (1996)
 Kusumagraj National Award for Poetry (2010)
 Honorary Doctorate from Tumkur University in 2011 for his Contribution to Kannada Literature and Cinema.
 Dinakar Desai Award for Poetry (2004)
 B.H.Shridhara Award for Amruthaballi Kashaya (1997)
 Katha Award from Delhi for Amruthaballi Kashaya
 DSC Prize for South Asian Literature 2018 for his translated work No Presents Please...

References

Further reading 
 

1954 births
Living people
Kannada-language lyricists
Kannada-language writers
Kannada poets
People from Uttara Kannada
Filmfare Awards South winners
Karnatak University alumni